Sir Joseph William Bazalgette CB (28 March 181915 March 1891) was a 19th-century English civil engineer. As chief engineer of London's Metropolitan Board of Works, his major achievement was the creation (in response to the Great Stink of 1858) of a sewerage system for central London which was instrumental in relieving the city of cholera epidemics, while beginning to clean the River Thames. He was also the designer of Hammersmith Bridge.

Early life
Bazalgette was born in Hill Lodge, Clay Hill, Enfield, London, the son of Joseph William Bazalgette (1783–1849), a retired Royal Navy captain, and Theresa Philo, born Pilton (1796–1850), and was the grandson of a French Protestant immigrant who had become wealthy.

In 1827, when Joseph was eight years old, the family moved into a newly built house in Hamilton Terrace, St. John's Wood, London. He spent his early career articled to the noted engineer Sir John Macneill, working on railway projects and amassed sufficient experience (partly in China and Ireland) in land drainage and reclamation to enable him to set up his own London consulting practice in 1842.

In 1845, the house in Hamilton Terrace was sold and Joseph married Maria Kough, from County Kilkenny, in Ireland. At the time he was working so hard on the expansion of the railway network that two years later, in 1847, he suffered a nervous breakdown.

In 1847, while he was recovering, London's Metropolitan Commission of Sewers ordered that all cesspits should be closed and that house drains should connect to sewers and empty into the Thames. As a result, a cholera epidemic ensued, killing 14,137 Londoners in 1849.

Bazalgette was appointed assistant surveyor to the Commission in 1849, taking over as Engineer in 1852, after his predecessor died of "harassing fatigues and anxieties." Soon after, another cholera epidemic struck, in 1853, killing 10,738. Medical opinion at the time held that cholera was caused by foul air: a so-called miasma. Physician Dr John Snow had earlier advanced a different explanation, which is now known to be correct: cholera was spread by contaminated water, but his view was not then generally accepted.

Championed by fellow engineer Isambard Kingdom Brunel, Bazalgette was appointed chief engineer of the commission's successor, the Metropolitan Board of Works, in 1856 (a post which he retained until the MBW was abolished and replaced by the London County Council in 1889). In 1858, the year of the Great Stink, Parliament passed an enabling act, in spite of the colossal expense of the project, and Bazalgette's proposals to revolutionise London's sewerage system began to be implemented. The expectation was that enclosed sewers would eliminate the stink ('miasma') that was thought to be the cause of cholera, and as a result eliminate cholera epidemics.

Sewer works

At that time, the River Thames was little more than an open sewer, empty of any fish or other wildlife, and an obvious public health hazard to Londoners.

The plan included major pumping stations at Deptford (1864) and at Crossness (1865) on the Erith marshes, both on the south side of the Thames, and at Abbey Mills (in the River Lea valley, 1868) and on the Chelsea Embankment (close to Grosvenor Bridge; 1875), north of the river. The outflows were diverted downstream where they were collected in two large sewage outfall systems on the north and south sides of the Thames, called the Northern and Southern Outfall Sewers. The sewage from the Outfall Sewers was originally collected in balancing tanks in Beckton and Crossness, then dumped, untreated, into the Thames at high tide.

The system was opened by Edward, Prince of Wales in 1865, although the whole project was not actually completed for another 10 years.

Partly as a result of the Princess Alice disaster, extensive sewage treatment facilities were built to replace the balancing tanks in Beckton and Crossness in 1900.

The basic premise of this expensive project, that miasma spread cholera infection, was wrong. However, the unintended consequence of the new sewer system was the removal of the causal bacterium from the water supply, thereby eliminating cholera in areas served by the sewers. Instead of the incorrect premise causing the project to fail, the new sewers mostly eliminated cholera, and also decreased the incidence of typhus and typhoid epidemics.

Bazalgette's capacity for hard work was remarkable: every connection to the sewerage system by the various Vestry Councils had to be checked and Bazalgette did this himself and the records contain thousands of linen plans with handwritten comments in Indian ink on them "Approved JWB", "I do not like 6" used here and 9" should be used. JWB", and so on. It is perhaps not surprising that his health suffered as a result. The records are held by Thames Water in large blue binders gold-blocked reading "Metropolitan Board of Works" and then dated, usually two per year.

Private life

Bazalgette lived at 17 Hamilton Terrace, St John's Wood, north London, for some years. Before 1851, he moved to Morden, then in 1873 to Arthur Road, Wimbledon, where he died in 1891. He was buried in the nearby churchyard at St Mary's Church.

In 1845 at Westminster, he married Maria Kough (1819–1902). Lady Bazalgette died at her residence in Wimbledon on 3 March 1902. They had eleven children including:
Joseph William, born 20 February 1846
Charles Norman born 3 March 1847
Edward, born 28 June 1848
Theresa Philo, born 1850
Caroline, born 17 July 1852
Maria, born 1854
Henry, born 14 September 1855
Willoughby, born 1857
Maria Louise, born 1859
Anna Constance, born 3 December 1859
Evelyn, born 1 April 1861

Awards and memorials

Bazalgette was knighted in 1875, and elected President of the Institution of Civil Engineers in 1883.

A Greater London Council blue plaque commemorates Bazalgette at 17 Hamilton Terrace in St John's Wood in North London, and he is also commemorated by a formal monument on the Victoria Embankment by the River Thames in central London. In July 2020, it was announced that a new public space west of Blackfriars Bridge, formed following construction of the Thames Tideway Scheme, would be named the Bazalgette Embankment.

Dulwich College has a scholarship in his name either for design and technology or for mathematics and science.

Other works

Albert Embankment (1869)
Victoria Embankment (1870)
Chelsea Embankment (1874)
Maidstone Bridge (1879)
Albert Bridge (1884; modifications)
Putney Bridge (1886)
Hammersmith Bridge (1887)
The Woolwich Free Ferry (1889)
Battersea Bridge (1890)
Charing Cross Road
Garrick Street
Northumberland Avenue
Shaftesbury Avenue
Early plans for the Blackwall Tunnel (1897)
Proposal for what later became Tower Bridge

Notable descendants
Ian Bazalgette (great-grandson), RAF pilot awarded a Victoria Cross
Peter Bazalgette (great-great-grandson), television producer
Edward Bazalgette (great-great-grandson), musician and television director

References

Further reading

Sir Joseph William Bazalgette (1819–1891): Engineer to the Metropolitan Board of Works – D P Smith: Transactions of the Newcomen Society, 1986–87 Vol 58.
London in the Nineteenth Century: A Human Awful Wonder of God – Jerry White, London: Jonathan Cape 2006.
The Big Necessity: Adventures in the world of human waste by Rose George, Portobello Books, . book review (subscription needed for whole article) in New Scientist

Choice or chance? The virtues of London Stock bricks for the construction of the Bazalgette sewer network in London (c.1860-1880)-I J Smalley, A Assadi Langroudi, G.Lill, British Brick Society Information 148, 10–19. 2021.

External links

  "How Bazalgette built London's first super-sewer," by Alwyn Collinson, 26 March 2019, Museum of London
 "Construction of London's Victorian sewers: the vital role of Joseph Bazalgette," by G C Cook, The Fellowship of Postgraduate Medicine 
 BBC biography
 Newcomen Society paper (from Internet Archive)
 Battersea Bridge
 Crossness Pumping Station
 Bazalgette family tree

 
 
 
 
 
 

1819 births
1891 deaths
Companions of the Order of the Bath
English civil engineers
Health in London
Water supply and sanitation in London
Presidents of the Institution of Civil Engineers
Presidents of the Smeatonian Society of Civil Engineers
Thames Water
Metropolitan Board of Works
People from the London Borough of Enfield
19th-century English architects
Knights Bachelor
English people of French descent